The Hoobs is a live-action/animated children's television series created and produced by The Jim Henson Company and Decode Entertainment for Channel Four. Five series of 52 episodes were produced.

Plot
It stars five creatures called Hoobs (Hubba Hubba, Iver, Groove, Tula, and Roma) from the fictional Hoobland, and their interactions with earth and the human race. In each episode, they try to find the answer to a question to be put in the great Hoobopaedia (a database) created by Hubba Hubba, back in Hoobland, in hopes of learning all there is to know. Hubba Hubba remains in Hoobland to await the report from the other Hoobs, Iver, Groove, and Tula live in the Hoobmobile, and Roma travels to all parts of the world. The five creatures are muppets, but the show also includes some animated sequences as well as live motion of human children who explain concepts to the Hoobs.

Series 
A typical episode format involves:
 Hubba Hubba introduces the viewers to The Hoobs and the Opening Titles roll
 A preamble during which a question to be answered is stumbled upon.
 Hubba Hubba formalizes the task.
 Roma is e-mailed the question in order for her to provide a report.
 A line of dialogue with a question and statement ending "who", "what", "when", "where", "why" or "how" causes a cutaway to a Motorettes' performance of that word.
 There may be a song from the Hoobs or Motorettes, with familiar lyrics, or a familiar tune; operas and musicals are a favorite, or neither.
 The Hoobs visit the Tiddlypeeps children twice, as they're smart, they're fun, they know.
 One Hoob drives left hand drive, one visits and turns the key and the third may participate in the B-story.
 An animated story is aired, relating to the question.
 A report on a related subject appears on HoobNet, listed on the Hoobapaedia
 Various inappropriate solutions are rejected for an answer, just in time
 Hoob News summarizes the adventure then the end credits roll

Other series 
 Hello Hoobs – the five-minute "Hello Hoobs" segment include excerpts from the English-language version, edited to function as a teaching tool. Targeted at viewers between the ages of four and eight, the segment uses the Hoobs to expand English-language vocabulary and explain rudiments of grammar. The stated goal was to teach 400 words and 150 different expressions. The segment airs immediately prior to the half-hour The Hoobs broadcast on a weekly basis, and is compiled into a half-hour weekend broadcast for non-English countries, to serve as a review of knowledge.

Characters
 Iver: The leading figure of the threesome. He is very punctual and business-like, but likes to have fun, too. Iver is a great doer, but sometimes he tends to be a bit of a worrier. 
 Groove: Always cool and relaxed, and a little slower than the others. He is also a little shy and a bit more hesitant to leave the Hoobmobile. He has a talent for making music, and he enjoys collecting things. 
 Tula: The girl on board. She is sympathetic, caring and enthusiastic, though she's sometimes a little tiring to have around. Tula is very creative and loves crafts. 
 Roma: An explorer Hoob who travels around the world, gathering information for the Hoobopaedia by talking to the Tiddlypeeps children. Roma does not live in the Hoobmobile, but she frequently reports all her discoveries to Iver, Groove and Tula through video messages and sometimes she visits the Hoobmobile to help them with their questions. Roma rides a motorcycle called a Hooby Picki Picki, which is also powered by the Motorettes. In the series 3 episode "Roma's Visit" Roma talks to the Tiddlypeeps.
 Hubba Hubba: The leader of the Hoobs. From his home base in Hoobland, he updates the Hoobopaedia with all the info that Iver, Groove and Tula collect during their stay in our world. In the series 5 episode "The Big Bonk" Hubba Hubba comes to the Peep Planet to do Hoob News all by himself. 
 The Motorettes: Three robots. Their names are Tootle, Timp and Twang. The Motorettes operate the engine of the Hoobmobile by singing and making music. They also power Roma's motorcycle, Hooby Picki Picki.

Puppeteers
 Iver − voiced by Don Austen 
 Groove − voiced by John Eccleston (series 1−3) and Mark Jefferis (series 4−5)
 Tula − voiced by Julie Westwood
 Roma − voiced by Gillie Robic 
 Hubba Hubba − voiced by Mark Jefferis (series 1−3, 4 (Occasionally) and Brian Herring (series 4−5)
 The Motorettes − voiced by Rebecca Nagan (Tootle), Wim Booth (Timp) and Mark Jefferis (Twang)
 Steven Kynman, Victoria Willing, Ivestyn Evans, Robert Skidmore and Susan Beattie served as assistant puppeteers in the series.
 Mak Wilson, Katherine Smee, Dave Taylor, Jason Hopley and Jamie Shannon served as puppeteer accountants in the show's final series and on Hooby Happy Holidays on Sprout.

Vehicles
 Hoobmobile is a colourful mobile home van. The Hoobmobile has a roof garden on its roof, peepholes and portholes, a copy of keyboard keys at its front, a door and a balcony at its back. It has a license plate of the title. The engine is powered by the Motorettes.
 Hooby Picki Picki is Roma's colourful motorcycle. The engine is powered by the Motorettes.

Production
Channel 4 announced in November 2000 that a new educational series, titled "The Hoobs", had been developed for a pre-school audience. In a £20 million joint venture between Channel 4 and The Jim Henson Company, the channel commissioned 250 half-hour episodes which were to be broadcast from early 2001 (to replace Sesame Street). The series was set to be the biggest pre-school series on British television as it was said that "Channel 4 hopes its Hoobs will be the new Teletubbies" and wished from it to match its success.

Executive vice-president, Angus Fletcher, of the Jim Henson Television Company commented that "We are delighted to have the opportunity to pioneer a groundbreaking format which will address the needs of the first truly multi-media generation."

Broadcast history

United Kingdom
The series premiered on Channel 4 on 15 January 2001 from 6:00am to 7:00am, with two episodes being broadcast each weekday morning. The episodes were repeated from 11:00 am, finishing its run of 250 episodes on 3 January 2003. Although the series ceased production in the United Kingdom in 2002, it was regularly repeated in the same early morning time slot for several years afterwards. It was temporarily taken off the schedule every year during the Christmas period and returned in the new year. However, 2014 was the final year that the series had been screened as it did not return following the Christmas holidays.

It also aired on Nick Jr UK from 2002 to 2004.

International
It has also been shown in other countries, including North America (repeats formerly airing on PBS Kids Sprout) and Australia airing on both ABC and ABC2 from 4 February 2002 to 2 July 2011. In Poland it aired on Polsat JimJam and TV4. It aired in Hungary on JimJam. In Spain, it was on Telemadrid and on K3 in Catalonia. Hop! in Israel, In Italy, "Hello Hoobs" was on JimJam. In Germany, the show aired on KiKA. In Latin America, Brazil and the Caribbean, the show aired on MVS TV and ZAZ. In Greece, the show aired on Star Channel. In Ireland, it was screened on TG4, where it was dubbed in Irish. In Hong Kong, It's Aired On TVB.

Episodes

Season 1 (2001)
 101. Finding Out: The Hoobs set out to learn some new things about Peeps and Tiddlypeeps.
 102. Monkeys: The gang wants to give a monkey something to make him happy, but cannot decide what will do the trick.
 103. Hello: How do Peeps and Tiddlypeeps say hello to their friends.
 104. Laughing: The Hoobs try to figure out what causes laughter.
 105. Stars: Iver searches for a bright shining star to hang up in the Hoobmobile.
 106. Pets: Groove decides he would like some company while out collecting and thinks a pet would fit the bill.
 107. Whistles: Tula tries to get Groove and Iver's attention, but they are too busy playing a game to notice. 
 108. Floating: The Hoobs miss floating on the water in a Hooblebobber. There are no Hooblebobbers on the Peep planet, but maybe they can find something that floats in just the same way.
 109. Dog: The pals investigate why a dog keeps barking outside the Hoobmobile.
 110. Running: Groove didn't want to do some running.  
 111. Getting Better: Iver suffers hot and cold flushes, and his nose starts making a strange sound – so he looks to the Tiddlypeeps for an explanation.
 112. Frogs: The friends marvel at how high frogs can jump, and wonder if it is because they eat flies.
 113. Losing Things: Iver searches high and low for his Hoobtoobe, but it appears to have vanished.
 114. Flags: The friends discover how Peeps use Hoobyhideys.
 115. Seasons: Groove notices his tree has changed its leaves and wonders whether they will grow back.
 116. Bees: The gang runs out of Hoobygoop, but discover the Peeps have a suitable substitute.
 117. Fix It: The pals call on their DIY skills to fix the Hoobytug.
 118. Homes: The friends discover which animals live in homes similar to theirs.
 119. Presents: The furry pals watch children giving each other gifts.
 120. Hair: Tula tries to brighten up the day by restyling her Hoobyfur.
 121. Clapping: Iver, Groove and Tula discover how Tiddlypeeps clap their hands.
 122. Smells: Tula needs something to make her smell especially for the Tiddlypeeps' party.
 123. Combs: The pals use the Peeps' combs to store their Hoobycookies until they discover what they are really meant for.
 124. Keeping Warm: Iver, Groove and Tula find a way to keep warm while Hooblegazing.
 125. Rain: The gang discovers how and why it rains.
 126. Wobble: Groove seeks a wobbly item to complete his collection of things that move.
 127. Owning Up: When Tula ruins Groove's best painting, she has to do something before he finds out.
 128. Sand: The gang learns about sand and what it is used for.
 129. Hooting: A mysterious hooting sound keeps the Hoobs awake at night.
 130. Soft Round Flat Things: The gang searches the Peep planet for soft, round, flat things to play with.
 131. Fish: Iver, Groove and Tula learn about creatures that like getting wet.
 132. Keys: The pals discover how keys are used to open things.
 133. Waiting: The gang discovers things to do while waiting for their Hooboblubbers to set.
 134. Shoes: Iver needs something to keep his paws dry from a wet puddle of juice on the floor.
 135. Flying: The Hoobs find something that can fly.
 136. Times: The gang finds out about the best time to visit the Tiddlypeeps.
 137. Getting To Sleep: Iver is having trouble going to sleep and needs some help.
 138. Potatoes: Groove shows off his potato plant, but finds there is just one problem – it does not have any potatoes on it.
 139. Mice: A hungry mouse tries to make a meal of the Hoobmobile.
 140. Teeth: Groove makes an interesting discovery – a tooth stuck in a piece of wood.

Season 2 (2001)
 201. Puppets: Iver, Groove and Tula seek a Tiddlypeep souvenir for the Hoobmobile.
 202. Angry: Groove does something to annoy his friend Tula.
 203. Holidays: Groove needs a break, but cannot decide what kind of holiday would suit him best.
 204. Boys And Girls: Tula thinks boys and girls like different things, but Groove is not so certain.
 205. Wind: Iver watches a feather blowing in the wind and decides it would make a good addition to the Hoobmobile.
 206. Getting Bigger: Groove wishes he were tall enough to reach the tools he needs from the top shelf.
 207. Rubbish: The gang learn how rubbish is recycled.
 208. Eggs: Groove finds a painted egg and wonders what it is for.
 209. Planes: The pals take to the air for a bird's-eye view of Earth.
 210. Dreams: Groove dances underwater with a mermaid – even though he is nowhere near the sea.
 211. Spots: A box of black sticky spots arrives for Tula from her aunt Hattie Hoob.
 212. Shopping: When Groove broke Tula's ponga ping leaf, he has to find something else that's red and round for her.
 213. Borrowing: Groove learns about borrowing when his Hoobysandwich hammer was broken.
 214. Fancy Dress: Tula and the pals are invited to a fancy dress party but they cannot decide what to wear.
 215. Crying: The pals investigate what makes people cry.
 216. Bells: The gang decide to get a bell for Groove so they can keep track of his whereabouts.
 217. Sharing: The Hoobynut in the roof garden is ready to eat, giving the pals the perfect opportunity to learn about sharing.
 218. Up And Down: The gang learns about things that go up and down.
 219. Dancing: The gang tries to learn a new Peep dance.
 220. Dirty: Groove makes the most of being covered in dirt.
 221. Juiciest Fruit: Groove ate Tula's apple tower and sets out to make it up to her by finding the biggest, juiciest fruit.
 222. High Up: The pals enjoy the view from the roof garden of the Hoobmobile and wonder what it would be like to be much higher up.
 223. Cows: The gang reveals their favorite things about cows and Groove makes cheese.
 224. Shy: Iver and Tula help Groove calm his nerves before a musical performance.
 225. The Band: The friends want to play their favorite Tiddlypeep music, but first have to work out what all the instruments are.

Season 3 (2001)
 301. Circus: The friends help Iver decide which circus job would suit him best.
 302. Upside Down: Tula paints a mysterious picture, and the others cannot decide what it is.
 303. Rings: Iver, Groove and Tula celebrate a special day but realise they have left something important behind in Hoobland.
 304. Cakes: Tula and Iver take turns at baking cakes for the gang.
 305. Boats: The friends visit the seaside, where they learn all about boats.
 306. Freezing: The Hoobs are disappointed to find their Hoobofizz frozen, which means they cannot drink it.
 307. Fresh: The gang need something to keep the Hoobypuffs fresh.
 308. Waking Up: The pals wonder how they can wake up before the sun rises.
 309. Exploring: Tula goes exploring, but she cannot decide what to take with her and where to put it all.
 310. Exercise: The friends keep fit by doing a few Peep exercises.
 311. Pairs: Iver is mystified to see a Tiddlypeep in two places at once.
 312. Funny Faces: Iver, Groove and Tula try out ways of making themselves look different.
 313. Cool: The sun makes the friends feel so hot they are unable to answer any questions.
 314. Stripes: The gang try to find something that has stripes to decorate the model.
 315. Tidying Up: The pals get out all their favorite collections and have a good look at them.
 316. Friends: Tula makes gifts for everyone except Hubba Hubba, who feels disappointed at being left out.
 317. Messages: The computer breaks down, prompting the gang to look for other ways of sending messages.
 318. Names: Tula decides she would rather have a Peep name, but is not sure which one would suit her best.
 319. Snow: The Hoobs figure out how they can have fun in the snow.
 320. Roma's Visit: Roma comes to visit her friends and wants to her holiday special.
 321. Colours: The friends learn about coordinating the colours of their grippers.
 322. Gloves: The Hoobs need a way to make Hoobocactospiker shakes without hurting their paws.
 323. Stuffing: The pals want to get Humpty Dumpty to sit on the wall, but first the floppy fellow needs stuffing.
 324. Stories: Tula wants to write a story, but she does not know what story to write.
 325. Taste: The gang tries some Hoobycookies with different tastes.
 326. Brave: The Hoobs want to know how they can feel brave. 
 327. Fly Away: Iver makes friends with a little bird that visits him in the roof garden every day.
 328. Hiding: The friends need to find a hiding place to hide from Hubba Hubba.
 329. Copying: The pals find some things that are exactly the same.
 330. Shells: The Hoobs figure out what sort of shell can be useful.
 331. Swinging: The pals find something to go swinging on the roof garden instead of a Hoobypod.
 332. Scared: Tula tries to overcome her fear of thunder.
 333. Pop: The friends find ten things that go pop.
 334. Spiky: The gang find something that is round and spiky.
 335. Tula's Choice: Tula cannot decide which friend to take with her to the seaside.
 336. Sheep: The pals need something to fix their blanket.
 337. Disappearing: The Hoobs figure out a way to make the purple mark disappear.
 338. Hobbies: Iver wants to find a hobby that suits him.
 339. Toys: The friends look at all kinds of Tiddlypeep toys.
 340. Slow: Groove and Tula try to help Iver slow down.
 341. Crumbs: The gang wonders what happened to the Tiddlypeep buns.
 342. Hang Ups: Groove needs something to hang up his CDs.
 343. Picking Up: The Hoobs try to find some way to pick up Tula's Hoobypins out of the box without getting pricked.
 344. Dark: The pals figure out why night has to be so dark.
 345. It's a Mystery: Hubba Hubba wants to read a Tiddlypeep fairy tale, but he is missing a page from his book.
 346. Dinosaur: Groove cannot figure out where he can put this toy dinosaur in his collection.
 347. Wheels: The friends wonder what sort of wheels could they have in the Hoobmobile.
 348. Soft: Tula needs something soft so she does not hurt herself.
 349. New Words: The friends need to learn how to say some new words.
 350. Behind You: The gang find something to look behind them.
 351. Bubbles: The Hoobs wonder why they are bubbles in the Hoobypond.
 352. Bouncing: The pals find some things that can bounce.
 353. Big Loaf: The friends made the biggest Hoobynut loaf ever.
 354. Lucky: Tula needs a good luck charm to make her feel lucky.
 355. Hats: The Hoobs wonder why Peeps wear flowerpots on their heads, which are hats.
 356. Camel: The gang cannot figure out why camels have humps.
 357. Talking to Yourself: Groove and Tula think Iver is talking to himself, but he thinks he was talking to someone else.
 358. Surprises: The most important day in a Hoob's year is their hoobytwizzletuft day - the day when they first got their twizzletuft clipped. This year Tula has given Iver and Groove a beautiful doll.
 359. Ba-Boom!: Iver has a ba-boom inside his chest.
 360. Trees: The friends discover fruit in the Heebleleaf tree.

Season 4 (2001–2002)
 401. Hooblebumper Breakfast: Tula and Groove decide to have a huge Hoob breakfast called a Hooblebumper breakfast.
 402. Hoobyclues: The Hoobs are enjoying a good game of Hoobyclues. It's one of the Hoobs' favourite games and it helps them to unravel the mystery about the nuts that Groove found in a hole.
 403. Ouch: After preparing for a picnic, Tula's paw gets stung, and it really hurts.
 404. Round And Round: Iver scoffs at this: there is no such as something that goes round and round without stopping... is there?
 405. The Fair: Roma is coming to visit, so the Hoobs try and think of fun to do with her.
 406. Pockets: Tula has made Groove a pocket on her Hooby-stitcher-upper but he cannot decide what to put in it.
 407. Funny Tummies: The Hoobs are wondering what are belly buttons for. 
 408. Shape Sorter: Groove's collection of "Different Shaped Things He Doesn't Know What to Do With" gets in Iver's way.
 409. Crash Bang Wallop: Groove decides to start a new collection – round flat things that make a Hoobgroovy noise.
 410. Peep Flowers: The Hoobs learn about flowers.
 411. Winning: Iver and Tula are mystified when Groove wins many egg and spoon races that they all enjoy doing – he normally loses.
 412. Groove's Wish: Groove is hoping for his wish to come true.
 413. A Pig Full of Surprises: Groove discovers a piggy bank containing some money.
 414. Rewards: Because they are good friends, Tula decides to make a reward for Iver and Groove. 
 415. Hoob in a Mood: Groove is in a bad and foul mood. Tula and Iver try to find a way to cheer him up.
 416. Moon: While reading poetry to Roma, Iver discovers the Man in the Moon.
 417. Soggy Crispies: Groove is taking Iver collecting, but Tula has made Hooby crispies.
 418. Giant: The Hoobs are reading Jack and the Beanstalk. Groove is Jack, Tula is Jack's mum and Iver is playing the giant.
 419. The Drip: The Hoobs are horrified when they discover a drip in the Hoobmobile ceiling.
 420. Pirates: Groove finds a treasure chest. However, he hears that pirates like to steal treasure.
 421. Hoobamaflip: The Hoobs find a way to work the Hoobamaflip.
 422. Magic Words: The Hoobs want to celebrate Shoobedyshiny Day by wearing shoop-shoop and doing the shoop-shoop dance.
 423. Beautiful: Groove is unable to figure out why there is an old metal thing in his collection of beautiful things.
 424. Funny Sounds: The Hoobs find something that makes funny sounds.
 425. Art: The Hoobs want to make all kinds of art.
 426. That Noise: Iver makes a strange sound when he hurts his arm.
 427. Our Friend Flash: The Hoobs cannot figure out what is wrong with Flash the tortoise.
 428. Achoo!: Iver and Tula get jumped when Groove begins to sneeze.
 429. A Doob for a Hoob: Tula and Iver cannot figure out who Groove is talking to.
 430. Big Day In: The Hoobs want to go on a trip outdoors but it starts raining.
 431. Miss Hoob: The Hoobs and Tula cannot figure out which job will be perfect.
 432. Yawning: The Hoobs cannot figure out why are they yawning.
 433.
 434. Relax: Groove and Tula help Iver relax.
 435. Get on With the Game: Iver wants to find out how to play a mystery message game.
 436. Groove the Greedy: Groove is being greedy when he did not share all the sweets.
 437. Fairyland: Tula wants to be a fairy queen but she does not know how to.
 438. Hoobyhics: Tula has the  but she has lots of things to do.
 439. Clumsy: Tula is very clumsy and does not know why.
 440. Hurry Up: Iver and Tula need Groove to speed things up.
 441. A Place for Tula: Tula wants to find a place to write her poem.
 442. Mums and Dads: Roma babysits the  while its mum and dad are away.
 443. Underground: The Hoobs wonder what is like to live underground.
 444. Warm Juice: Tula needs some way to make her  warm while she paints a picture of the penguins.
 445.
 446. Every Hoob's a Star: Iver begins to show off when he is full of bright ideas.
 447. Riddle Me Ree: Roma and the Hoobs try to play a riddle game.
 448. Little Round Somethings: The Hoobs want to know what those little round things are.
 449. Jobs: The Hoobs want to find a job that will suit them.
 450. Tula's Big Day: Tula is getting ready for a big day at the Tiddlypeeps' school.
 451. Creepy Crawlies: Tula and Iver want to know what kind of creepy-crawly is inside Groove's box.
 452. Birdsong: Tula hears a little bird singing in the Heebleleaf tree on the roof garden.
 453. Playhouse: The Hoobs want to build a playhouse so they can have fun.
 454. Flies: The Hoobs need something to keep the pesky flies away from their Hoobyfigs.
 455. Tula in Wonderland: Tula is feeling very bored and needs something to cure her boredom.
 456. Clubs: Iver and the Hoobs need something to make their club special.
 457. Hoobydudu: Hubba Hubba take care of a Hoobydudu egg for Auntie Hattie.
 458. Robin Hood: The Hoobs find out what life was like for Robin Hood.
 459. A Whale of a Time: Iver wants to go whale-watching with the Tiddlypeeps but he is afraid of whales.
 460. A Problem for the Pansies: Iver is not sure how his pansies are among Tula's big yellow flowers.
 461. Seeing Clearly: Tula cannot see a thing and thinks there is something wrong with her eyes.
 462. The Old Bamboo: Groove has some old bamboo instead of some sticks.
 463. Down in the Middle: The Hoobs find out what is deep down inside the Peep Planet.
 464. Somebody Loves You: Iver wants to find out who the card is from.
 465. Don't Drink the Water: The Hoobs are wondering why the lemonade tastes terrible.
 466. Iver the Robot: Iver would like to be a robot without thinking or getting his feelings hurt.
 467. Marooned: The Hoobs want to know how Robinson Crusoe escapes from a desert island.
 468. Rude Hoob: Groove really wants to put Iver's flashing bow tie in his collection.
 469. Hoozleberry Blues: The Hoobs do not know what happened to the  bush.
 470. Sir Iverlot: Iver wants to be a very brave knight.
 471. Yee Haw: Groove wishes he could be with the cows all the time.
 472. Iver's Big Trip: Iver needs something to take with him to go on a trip.
 473. Bedtime Story: Iver finds a way to read his book without keeping Tula and Groove awake.

Season 5 (2002–2003)
 501. Hoobledoop: Roma has been asked to take pictures of Groove and his collections for a magazine in Hoobland. 
 502. Hooblebumper Box Day: Every year the Hoobs celebrate Hooblebumper Box Day.
 503. Chocolate: Tula is making some gingerbread Hoobs and has some chocolate button ready.
 504. Dangerous: The Hoobs learn about things that are dangerous.
 505. News: The Hoobnews screen is broken.
 506. Groove's Special Collection: Groove is trying to think up another collection – but this one needs to be special.
 507. Cards: Groove has found a pack of cards in his collection and wants to do clever stuff with them.
 508. Change: Iver is tired of everything being the same. He wants to change himself more than anything.
 509. Sherlock Groove: On the cluttered cupboard floor, there is a filthy tablecloth which Iver decides to clean.
 510. Not A Horse: Groove's friend Tim has a favorite animal, and it is an unusual animal.
 511. Elbows: Iver is frustrated. He keeps banging his elbow and it really hurts.
 512.
 513. Hooby Grow in a Day Tree: Groove grows Hooby Grow in a Day Tree, which is literally a tree that grows in the day.
 514. Little Pink Riding Hoob: The Hoobs are putting on a play for the Tiddlypeeps. 
 515. Hooby Races: It is Sports Day, and the Hoobs attempt their own.
 516. Little Green Sticky Thing: Groove has found a little green thing on one of the trees on the roof garden.
 517. Tiger in Need: Tula hears a tiger named Tallulah that needs help.
 518. Promises: Groove just cannot help himself – he keeps breaking promises, and Iver and Tula are sick of it.
 519. Twinkly Wrinklypeep: When the Hoobyharvest produces too much food, Iver decides to spare to the old people's home down the road.
 520. Cover Up: In a tussle with Tula, Groove manages to splatter his Hoobjuice on the wall, and Hoobjuice is famous for staining.
 521. Iver's Buns: Someone has been moving Tula's seashells in the hoobyfridge and Iver's buns up on the roof garden.
 522. Buddy Beacon: Tula is building something to show the passing  that the Hoobs are down on the Peep Planet.
 523. The Fastest Thing on Legs: Iver is the fastest thing on legs on the Peep Planet.
 524. Banana Banana Carrot: The Hoobs find out what kind of game it is on a game show.
 525. Emperor: Iver wants to be the emperor of the high .
 526. Tight Fit: Groove cannot go jogging if his vest does not fit.
 527. Hooby Holiday: Tula's friend Jake is left behind when his friends go on an activity holiday.
 528. Opera Singer: Tula wants to make her voice sound like opera singing.
 529. Signs: The Hoobs wonder why some signs are useful.
 530. House of Iver: Iver wants to wear some clothes so he can go the Tiddlypeeps' garden party.
 531. Jambo Tambo: Tula and the Hoobs' African friend Rijina is going to release Tambo the baby elephant back into the wild.
 532. Lost: Iver and Groove have gone missing, so Tula and Roma have to find out where they are.
 533. Overloaded: The Hoobs are puzzled why the Motorettes are wheezing and puffing.
 534. Restaurant: Tula is fed up with her cooking and wants to visit a nice restaurant.
 535. Flower Power: The Hoobs want to take some flowers back to Hoobland to remind them of the Peep gardens.
 536. Iver Five-O: Iver wonders what is like to ride in a police car.
 537. Llama Farmer: The Hoobs are curious about an animal on the Peep Planet that looks like another Hoob.
 538. Record Breaker: The Hoobs want to break a world record before they do Hoob News.
 539. Three Hoobs, One Bus: The Hoobs wonder why the Hoobmobile is big enough for them.
 540. Voice Choice: Groove and Tula cannot figure out why Iver is whining.
 541. Day Off: Hubba Hubba gives the Hoobs a nice day off.
 542. Pancakes: The Hoobs need some ingredients to make some pancakes.
 543. Costume Drama: The Hoobs are invited to the Tiddlypeeps' costume party.
 544. Soft Floppy Fun: Tula and Iver put a smile on Groove's face by trying to find a tail that will suit him.
 545. Window Dressing: Tula thinks the windows look beautiful, but Iver disagrees.
 546. Tricks with Bricks: Tula wants to build whatever she likes with bricks.
 547. King of the Sea: Iver, Groove, Tula and Roma wonder who will be king of the sea.
 548. Shop Til You Drop: The Hoobs figure out what will they have for their very own shop.
 549. The Big Bonk: The Hoobs do not know why Hubba Hubba is not responding.
 550. Bossy Boots: Tula and Groove need some way to stop Iver interfering.
 551. The Flapperdipperdancer: The Hoobs are invited to an art competition to make an amazing animal.
 552. Is This Hoobletoodledoo?: Hubba Hubba gives the Hoobs some exciting news: they are going back to Hoobland. The Hoobs are sad that they are going to miss the Peep Planet.

Home Media releases
From 2001-2003 in the United Kingdom, Columbia TriStar Home Entertainment released four VHSs in the United Kingdom each containing two episodes: "Finding Out", "Holidays", "Funny Faces" and "Groove's Wish". Three of the tapes were also released as a bi-pack, and a promotional tape named "Meet the Hoobs" was also released.

"Groove's Wish" was also issued out on DVD by CTHE, which included an extra episode. Another DVD - "Hooble Toodle Doo!", was released in September 2005 by HIT Entertainment.

Video game
A video game based on the show was released for the PlayStation on 7 June 2002, developed by Runecraft and published by Sony Computer Entertainment Europe.

See also
 The Muppets

References

External links
 
 The Hoobs at Muppet Wiki
 Hoobs entry on H2G2
 The Hoobs at Channel4.com

Channel 4 original programming
2001 British television series debuts
2003 British television series endings
2000s British children's television series
2001 Canadian television series debuts
2003 Canadian television series endings
2000s Canadian children's television series
2000s preschool education television series
British preschool education television series
Canadian preschool education television series
BAFTA winners (television series)
British children's fantasy television series
British children's science fiction television series
Canadian children's fantasy television series
Canadian children's science fiction television series
Television series by DHX Media
Television series by The Jim Henson Company
Television series about extraterrestrial life
British television shows featuring puppetry
Canadian television shows featuring puppetry
British television series with live action and animation
Canadian television series with live action and animation
Television shows set in England
English-language television shows